Nea Penteli is a small municipal unit - village in the northeastern part of the Athens agglomeration, Greece. Since the 2011 local government reform it is part of the municipality Penteli, of which it is a municipal unit.

Geography

Nea Penteli is situated at the southwestern foot of the Penteli mountains, at  elevation. The municipal unit has an area of 3.230 km2. At the centre of the village is a small hill named Profitis Ilias, after the small church constructed on top of it. Nea Penteli has one primary school and a high school.

Historical population

See also
List of municipalities of Attica

References

External links
Cultural Activities department, Πνευματικό Κέντρο
Public Library of Cultural Activities department, Βιβλιοθήκη Πνευματικού Κέντρου

Populated places in North Athens (regional unit)